Thomas Alexander Browne  (born Brown, 6 August 1826 – 11 March 1915) was an Australian author who published many of his works under the pseudonym Rolf Boldrewood. He is best known for his 1882 bushranging novel Robbery Under Arms.

Biography
Browne was born in London, the eldest child of Captain Sylvester John Brown, a shipmaster formerly of the East India Company, and his wife Elizabeth Angell, née Alexander. His mother was his "earliest admirer and most indulgent critic . . . to whom is chiefly due whatever meed of praise my readers may hereafter vouchsafe" (Dedication Old Melbourne Memories). Thomas added the 'e' to his surname in the 1860s. After his father's barque Proteus had delivered a cargo of convicts in Hobart, the family settled in Sydney in 1831. Sylvester Brown took up whaling and built a stone mansion, Enmore, which gave its name to the suburb of Sydney. Thomas Browne was sent to W. T. Cape's school at Sydney, and afterwards to Sydney College, when Cape became its headmaster. One of Browne's closest school friends was a son of Colonel John George Nathaniel Gibbes, MLC, the Collector of Customs for New South Wales, and according to the Dulhunty Papers, Browne spent carefree holidays staying with the Gibbes family at their grand waterside residence on Sydney's Point Piper.

When his father moved to Melbourne in 1839, Browne remained at Sydney College as a boarder until 1841 and then was taught by Rev. David Boyd in Melbourne. In 1843, though only 17 years old, Browne took up land near Port Fairy which he named Squattlesamere and was there until 1856. He visited England in 1860 and in 1862–1863 had a property, Murrabit run at Lake Boga near Swan Hill, followed by Bundidgaree station on the Murrumbidgee River near Narrandera in the Riverina in 1864. However, bad seasons in 1866 and 1868 compelled Browne to give up squatting, and in 1871 he became a police magistrate and gold commissioner. After living in Sydney a short time, in April 1871 he was appointed a police magistrate at Gulgong and gold commissioner in 1872.

Browne was an experienced justice of the peace, having acted as chairman of the bench of justices at Narrandera, but in his first years at Gulgong, then one of the richest and largest goldfields in New South Wales, his ignorance of mining and the complicated regulations drew criticism of his competence as commissioner. He was persistently attacked by the Gulgong Guardian until in 1873 it published an anonymous letter accusing him of bias and corruption. Its editor Thomas Frederic De Courcy Browne  was thereupon convicted in Sydney of criminal libel and sentenced to six months gaol. The charges against Browne were disproved, and he won favour with the miners by magnanimously interceding with the judge for a light punishment of his libeller. In 1881 Browne was transferred as magistrate and mining warden to Dubbo and to Armidale in 1884. He moved to Albury as chairman of the Land Licensing Board in 1885, serving there as magistrate and warden from 1887 to 1895 until retiring to Melbourne. He died on 11 March 1915 in Melbourne and was buried in Brighton Cemetery.

Literary career
Browne spent around twenty-five years as a squatter and about the same time as a government official, but his third career as author extended over forty years. In 1865, while recovering from a riding accident, he wrote two articles on pastoral life in Australia for the Cornhill Magazine, and he also began to contribute articles and serial stories to the Australian weeklies. One of these, Ups and Downs: a Story of Australian Life, was published in book form in London in 1878. It was well reviewed but attracted little notice. It was re-issued as The Squatter's Dream in 1890.

In 1884 Old Melbourne Memories, a book of reminiscences of the eighteen-forties was published at Melbourne, "by Rolf Boldrewood, author of My Run Home, The Squatter's Dream and Robbery Under Arms". These had appeared in the Sydney Town and Country Journal and The Sydney Mail, but only The Squatter's Dream had been published in book form and then under the title of Ups and Downs. The name Boldrewood came from a line in the poem Marmion by Browne's favourite author, Sir Walter Scott.

In 1888 Robbery Under Arms appeared in three volumes and its merits were immediately recognised. Several editions were printed before the close of the century. At the beginning of this novel the narrator, Dick Marston, is awaiting execution for crimes committed whilst he was a bushranger. He goes on to tell the story of his life and loves and his association with the notorious Captain Starlight. Some of the events in the book are based on actual incidents carried out by contemporary bushrangers like Daniel Morgan, Ben Hall, Frank Gardiner, James Alpin McPherson and John Gilbert. Robbery under Arms has remained popular since its first publication in 1888; the novel was filmed in 1907 (a version by Tait brothers and a version by Charles MacMahon), 1920 and 1957. A television series was made in 1985. The novel has also been serialised on radio in both Australia and Britain.

Recognition
Named in his honour, the Rolf Boldrewood Literary Awards were awarded annually from 2006 to 2017 by the Macquarie Regional Library.

Family
Browne married Margaret Maria Riley (daughter of W. E. Riley and granddaughter of Alexander Riley) in 1860. She was the author of The Flower Garden in Australia, published in 1893, and survived him with two sons and five daughters, one of whom, "Rose Boldrewood", published a novel The Complications at Collaroi in 1911.
Fourth daughter Louisa Browne married mine manager Robert Silvers Black on 11 June 1903.

His sister, Emma, had married Molesworth Richard Greene of Woodlands, near Sunbury and thus connecting him to Sir William Stawell, and also the Chomley family (Hussey Malone Chomley, Judge Arthur Wolfe Chomley and Charles Henry Chomley).

A brother, Sylvester John Browne was a mine manager.

Bibliography

Novels
My Run Home (1874)
The Squatter's Dream: A Story of Australian Life (1875) [aka Ups and Downs : A Story of Australian Life]
A Colonial Reformer (1876)
Babes in the Bush (1877) [aka An Australian Squire]
Robbery Under Arms (1882)
The Sealskin Coat (1884–1885) [aka The Sealskin Mantle]
The Crooked Stick, or, Pollie's Probation (1885) [aka The Final Choice, or, Pollie's Probation]
The Sphinx of Eaglehawk: A Tale of Old Bendigo (1887)
A Sydney-Side Saxon (1888)
Nevermore (1889–1890)
The Miner's Right : A Tale of the Australian Goldfields (1890)
A Modern Buccaneer (1894)
Plain Living: A Bush Idyll (1898)
War to the Knife', or Tangata Maori (1899)
The Ghost-Camp, or, The Avengers (1902)
The Last Chance: A Tale of the Golden West (1905)

Short story collections

A Romance of Canvas Town and Other Stories (1898)
In Bad Company and Other Stories (1901)

Autobiography

Non-fiction

S. W. Silver & Co's Australian Grazier's Guide : 1. Sheep [and] II. Cattle (1879)
S. W. Silver & Co.'s Australian Grazier's Guide (1879)
S. W. Silver & Co.'s Australian Grazier's Guide : No. II – Cattle. (1881)

References
T. Inglis Moore, 'Browne, Thomas Alexander (Rolf Boldrewood) (1826–1915)', Australian Dictionary of Biography, Volume 3, MUP, 1969, pp 267–269.

External links

 
 
 
 Works by Rolf Boldrewood at Project Gutenberg Australia
 
 
 Thomas Alexander Browne (1826–1915) Gravesite at Brighton General Cemetery (Vic)
 

1826 births
1915 deaths
19th-century Australian journalists
19th-century Australian male writers
19th-century Australian novelists
19th-century Australian public servants
19th-century Australian short story writers
19th-century British male writers
19th-century British writers
19th-century English novelists
Australian male novelists
English emigrants to colonial Australia
English male novelists
Gold commissioners
Victorian novelists
Writers from London
Australian male journalists
19th-century squatters